The Commonwealth Shoe and Leather Company is a historic factory complex at 7 Marble Street in Whitman, Massachusetts.  The Commonwealth Shoe Company was formed in 1885 by the merger of Charles H. Jones & Co. and Bay State Shoe & Leather Co.  The company produced the hugely popular Bostonian shoe, known for its high quality and comfort.  The Whitman factory complex was its original site.  British shoemaker Clarks acquired the brand in 1979, and still produces it.

The factory complex was listed on the National Register of Historic Places in 2014.

See also
National Register of Historic Places listings in Plymouth County, Massachusetts

References

Manufacturing plants in the United States
Industrial buildings and structures on the National Register of Historic Places in Massachusetts
Buildings and structures in Plymouth County, Massachusetts
Whitman, Massachusetts
National Register of Historic Places in Plymouth County, Massachusetts